Muğanlı (also, Mughanly) is a village and municipality in the Agstafa District of Azerbaijan.  It has a population of 2,445.

References 

Populated places in Aghstafa District